Revivo or Rebibo may refer to:

People 
Revivo, the surname of many people:

Association footballers 
Daniel Revivo, current Canadian forward with Richmond Kickers
David Revivo, former F.C. Ashdod captain and Israeli international
Haim Revivo (born 1972), Israeli former international footballer
Shay Revivo, current Israeli midfielder with F.C. Ashdod
Yonatan Revivo, current Israeli midfielder contracted to Bnei Yehuda

Musicians 
Aaron Revivo, former band member of In Theory

Other 
Janice Rebibo, Boston-born Israeli poet
David Rebibo, Orthodox Jewish congregational rabbi

Jewish surnames